List by Family Name: A - B - C - D - E - F - G - H - I - J - K - M - N - O - R - S - T - U - W - Y - Z

 Fujieda Shizuo (December 20, 1907 – April 16, 1993)
 Fujii Sadakazu (born 1942)
 Fujisawa Shū (born 1959)
 Fujita Yoshinaga (born 1950)
 Fujiwara no Akisue (1055–1123)
 Fujiwara no Ietaka (1158–1237)
 Fujiwara no Kintō (966–1041)
 Fujiwara no Shunzei (1114–1204)
 Fujiwara no Teika (1162–1241)
 Fukada Kyūya (November 3, 1903 – March 21, 1971)
 Fukazawa Shichirō (January 29, 1914 – August 18, 1987)
 Fukuchi Gen'ichirō (May 13, 1841 – January 4, 1906)
 Fukuda Eiko (October 5, 1865 – May 2, 1927)
 Fukuda Sadayoshi (1917–2002)
 Fukushima Masami (February 18, 1929 – April 9, 1976)
 Fukuzawa Yukichi (January 10, 1835 – February 3, 1901)
 Funahashi Seiichi (December 25, 1904 – January 13, 1976)
 Furui Yoshikichi (born 1937)
 Futabatei Shimei (February 28, 1864 – May 10, 1909)

F